fDi Intelligence is an English-language bi-monthly news and foreign direct investment (FDI) publication, providing an up-to-date review of global investment activity. The A4 glossy pages reach a circulation of 15,488 ABC audited, active corporate and crossborder investment professionals across the world.

fDi Intelligence is a central part of the fDi Intelligence portfolio of investment products and services from the Financial Times.

Features
fDi Intelligence focuses primarily on FDI news and in-depth analysis of the corporate investment climate across many sectors. Regular columns comprise the following:

FDI Report and Rankings
fDi Intelligence publishes an annual fDi Report which provides an overview of the global FDI statistics as well as a breakdown of the current picture in key regions like Asia-Pacific, Europe, North America, Latin America & the Caribbean, Middle East & Africa, and the BRIC nations. It also focuses on a current hot FDI topic (in 2013 it investigated taxation in FDI) and makes predictions for the FDI outlook for the following year.

A series of bi-annual rankings are published by fDi Intelligence which looks at the infrastructure, incentives and capabilities of cities and regions for attracting future inward investment. This includes:
Middle East and African Countries of the Future
American Cities of the Future
Asia-Pacific Cities of the Future
Caribbean and Central American Countries of the Future
European Cities and Regions of the Future
Global Free Zones of the Year
Global Cities of the Future
Polish Cities of the Future
Chinese Provinces of the Future
Middle East and North Africa Free Zones of the Year

Staff
The staff of fDi Intelligence consists of : 
Editor: Jacopo Dettoni
Global markets editor: Alex Irwin-Hunt
Global markets reporter: Seth O'Farrell
Senior contributor: Danielle Myles

References

External links
FT Group homepage highlighting individual publications
fDiIntelligence.com - the online home of fDi Magazine, providing news resource and database for industry or location-specific greenfield investment intelligence base
fDi Benchmark - Corporate Location Benchmarking Tool
GIS Planning - Customisable Online GIS Data Tools
fDi Markets - Crossborder Investment Monitor
fDi Markets Reports - In-Depth Research and Analysis

2001 establishments in the United Kingdom
Bi-monthly magazines published in the United Kingdom
Business magazines published in the United Kingdom
News magazines published in the United Kingdom
Financial Times
Foreign direct investment
Magazines published in London
Magazines established in 2001